The  Miss Florida Teen USA competition is the pageant that selects the representative for the state of Florida in the Miss Teen USA pageant.

Florida ties with Illinois and North Carolina for most Miss Photogenic awards (3).  These were won in a successive streak from 1996 to 1998. In 2021, Florida became the 27th state that won the Miss Teen USA title for the first time.

Miss Florida Teen USA and Miss Teen USA's Miss Photogenic in 1997, Cristin Duren, later became Miss Florida USA 2006 and  2004 titleholder Anastagia Pierre was later Miss Florida USA 2009. 1996 winner Kelly Gaudet later won the Miss Florida 2001 title and competed at Miss America.

The current titleholder is Alyssa Khan of Cooper City was crowned on May 29, 2022. She will represent Florida for the title of Miss Teen USA 2022.

Results summary

Placements
Miss Teen USA: Breanna Myles (2021)
Top 10/12: Stefanie Smith (1986), Christy Fatzinger (1994), Corrina Clark (1995), Nicole Broderick (1998), Lou Schieffelin (2018)
Top 15/16: Jennifer Wooten (2006), Jillian Wunderlich (2008), Alyssa Rivera (2010), Alyssa Khan (2022)
Florida holds a record of 10 placements at Miss Teen USA.

Awards
Miss Photogenic: Kelly Gaudet (1996), Cristin Duren (1997), Nicole Broderick (1998)

Winners 

Color key

1 Age at the time of the Miss Teen USA pageant

References

External links
Official website

Florida
Women in Florida
1996 establishments in Florida